The 2020 Best of Nollywood Awards was the 12th edition of the ceremony and took place in Ado-Ekiti, Ekiti State on 5 December 2020. The event was co-hosted by Tana Adelana and Debo Macaroni while the Ekiti State governor, Kayode Fayemi served as the chief host.

Living in Bondage: Breaking Free by Charles Okpaleke and This Lady Called Life by Kayode Kasum were identified as the biggest winners of the awards show.

Awards

References 

2020
2020 awards
2020 in Nigerian cinema